Glenn Diaz (born 24 October 1974) is a Guamanian breaststroke swimmer. He competed in three events at the 1992 Summer Olympics.

References

External links
 

1974 births
Living people
Guamanian male breaststroke swimmers
Olympic swimmers of Guam
Swimmers at the 1992 Summer Olympics
Place of birth missing (living people)